The 10th BRDC International Trophy was a motor race, run to Formula One rules, held on 3 May 1958 at the Silverstone Circuit, England. The race was run over 50 laps of the Grand Prix circuit, and was won by British driver Peter Collins in a Ferrari Dino 246.

The field also included several Formula Two cars, highest finisher being Cliff Allison in a Lotus 12, finishing in sixth place overall.

Results
Note: a blue background indicates a car running under Formula 2 regulations.

References 

BRDC International Trophy
BRDC International Trophy
BRDC International Trophy
BRDC International Trophy